, which literally means "Forest of Correction", is a sacred grove associated with an important Shinto sanctuary complex known in Japanese as the Kamo-jinja, situated near the banks of the Kamo River just north of where the Takano River joins the Kamo River in northeast Kyoto city, Japan. The term Kamo-jinja in Japanese is a general reference to Shimogamo Shrine and Kamigamo Shrine, the traditionally linked Kamo shrines of Kyoto. The Kamo-jinja serve the function of protecting Kyoto from malign influences.

The forest encompasses approximately 12.4 hectares, which are preserved as a national historical site (国の史跡). It is today the last remnant of a primeval forest which is reputed to have never been burned down. The forest has, in fact, suffered some damage over the centuries when all of Kyoto was burned during successive revolts and wars, but the forest growth has rebounded again and again. The forest is left to grow in its natural state. It is neither planted nor pruned.

The forest in ancient times comprised approximately 4,950,000 square meters of virgin forest. Due to wars during the Middle Ages and an edict in the 4th year of the Meiji era, it was reduced to its present area of approximately 124,000 square meters.

World Heritage site
The wooded area that is called by the name Tadasu-no-mori today lies on the grounds of Shimogamo Shrine, one of the seventeen historical sites in and around Kyoto which in 1994 were designated by UNESCO as Historic Monuments of Ancient Kyoto.

Notes

References
GoJapanGo.com: Shimogamo Shrine
Nelson, John K. (2000). Enduring Identities: The Guise of Shinto in Contemporary Japan. Honolulu: University of Hawaii Press. 
Terry, Thomas Philip. (1914). Terry's Japanese empire: including Korea and Formosa, with chapters on Manchuria, the Trans-Siberian railway, and the chief ocean routes to Japan; a guidebook for travelers. New York: Houghton Mifflin.

External links
Shimogamo Shrine website

Forests of Japan
Shinto shrines in Kyoto
World Heritage Sites in Japan
Geography of Kyoto